Nathaniel Kolawole Onadipe (14 July 1922 – 4 December 1988), most commonly known as Kola Onadipe, was a Nigerian author best known for his children's books.

Biography
Kola Onadipe was born in Ijebu-Ode, Ogun state, Nigeria. He was born into a polygamous family and was the second son of his mother. Onadipe studied law at the University of London in 1949 and later opened a law firm with his close friend Abraham Adesanya. He had fifteen children, seven boys and eight girls, to whom he dedicated his life and ensured they excelled in achieving acceptable academic status. He died at the age of sixty-six after he suffered a stroke on 4 December 1988. He was buried at his residential home in Ogbogbo, Ijebu-Ode, Nigeria.

He was the Principal of Olu-Iwa College (one of the four major high schools in Ijebu-Ode in the late 1940s, the 1950s and early 1960s). He was a staunch disciplinarian and kept the school in top level academic and moral flavour. His popular expression was "You go" which meant that if he caught you being a truant, you will be expelled regardless of who your parents might be. He was well respected by the proprietor of the school, Chief Timothy Adeola Odutola.

Boys from all over Nigeria who were admitted to the college became great men under him and went to higher institutions of learning both at home and abroad to become greater leaders and professionals in life. They are too many to mention or list.

Publications

He dedicated most of his lifetime to education and writing books for children. He wrote a number of children's books which include:

 The adventures of Souza. Ibadan: African Universities Press, 1963. 
 The boy slave. Lagos: African Universities Press, 1966. OCLC number 623440282
 Koku Baboni. Ibadan: African Universities Press, 1965. OCLC number 26910639
 Sugar girl. Nairobi: East African Pub, 1964. OCLC number 731260
 The magic land of the shadows. Lagos: African University Press, 1970. OCLC number 32497510
 The forest is our playground. Lagos, Nigeria: Africa Universities Press, 1972. OCLC number 1736920
 The return of Shettima. Lagos: University Press, 1972. OCLC number 1747640
 Builders of Africa. Ijebu-Ode, Nigeria: Natona Press, 1980. 
 Footprints on the Niger. Ijebu-Ode, Nigeria: Natona Press, 1980. 
 Sunny boy. Ijebu-Ode: Natona Press, 1980. OCLC number 9633828
 Sweet mother. Ijebu-Ode [Nigeria]: Natona Press, 1980. 
 Around Nigeria in thirty days. Nigeria:Natona, 1981. 
 Call me Michael. Ijebu-Ode, Nigeria: Natona Press, 1981. 
 Halima must not die : and other plays for schools. Ijebu-Ode: Natona Press, 1981. 
 Happy birthday : queen for a day. Ijebu-Ode, Nigeria: Natona Press, 1982. 
 Mothers-In-Law. 1982
 The Other Woman. 1982
 A pot of gold. Ijebu-Ode, Nigeria: Natona Press Publishers, 1984. 
 Beloved daughters. Ijebu-Ode, Nigeria: Natona Press, 1985. 
 The king is naked : and other stories. Ijebu-Ode, Nigeria: Natona Press, 1985. 
 The mysterious twins. Ijebu-Ode: Natona, 1986. OCLC number 633642923
 Binta : beautiful bride. Ijebu-Ode, Nigeria: Natona Press, 1988.

References 

Nigerian writers
1988 deaths
1922 births
Yoruba children's writers
20th-century Nigerian writers
People from Ijebu Ode
Alumni of the University of London
English-language writers from Nigeria
Nigerian educators
Yoruba legal professionals
Yoruba educators
Nigerian children's writers
20th-century Nigerian lawyers
Burials in Ogun State
Heads of schools in Nigeria
Nigerian expatriates in the United States